The Savage Woman is a Canadian drama film from Quebec, released in 1991. Directed by Léa Pool, the film stars Patricia Tulasne as Marianne, a young Canadian expatriate in Switzerland who escapes into the mountains after being assaulted by her boyfriend, and meets Élysée (Matthias Habich), an engineer camped out for the summer to monitor a hydroelectric dam, with whom she begins a new romance before eventually revealing that she killed her attacker.

The film was based on a short story by Swiss writer S. Corinna Bille.

The film premiered in August 1991 at the Montreal World Film Festival. It won the award for Best Canadian Film at that festival.

Awards
The film garnered three Genie Award nominations at the 12th Genie Awards:
Best Actor: Matthias Habich
Best Adapted Screenplay: Léa Pool, Michel Langlois and Laurent Gagliardi
Best Original Score: Jean Corriveau
Corriveau won the award for Best Original Score.

References

External links
 

1991 films
1991 drama films
Canadian drama films
Films directed by Léa Pool
French-language Canadian films
1990s Canadian films